Our Zoo is a British drama television series from BBC One, first broadcast on 3 September 2014. The six-part series, written by Matt Charman and directed by Andy De Emmony, is about George Mottershead, his dreams of creating a cage-free zoo, his family and how their lives changed when they embarked on the creation of Chester Zoo.

Cast
Lee Ingleby as George Mottershead
Liz White as Lizzie Mottershead
Anne Reid as Lucy Mottershead
Peter Wight as Albert Mottershead
Ralf Little as Billy Atkinson
Sophia Myles as Lady Katherine Longmore
Stephen Campbell Moore as Reverend Aaron Webb
Amelia Clarkson as Muriel Mottershead
Honor Kneafsey as June Mottershead

Production
Our Zoo was commissioned by Danny Cohen and Ben Stephenson for BBC One. The series was based on an idea introduced to Big Talk Productions by Aenon, the production company headed by Adam Kemp. Filming took place in Liverpool, as well as at Walton Hall in Warrington and at Abney Hall in Cheadle. When BBC said there would be no second series of Our Zoo, many fans were left surprised by the decision. On 10 December 2014 the Chester Chronicle created an online petition in the hopes of renewing the show for another series, and by the next day more than 1000 fans had signed it. In spite of these efforts, however, the BBC reiterated that they would not be producing a second series.

Episode list

References

External links

 
 

2014 British television series debuts
2014 British television series endings
Television series set in the 1930s
BBC television dramas
2010s British drama television series
Television shows set in Cheshire
2010s British television miniseries
English-language television shows
Zoos